Ben Lucas may refer to:

 Ben Lucas (rugby union) (born 1987), Australian rugby union footballer
 Ben Lucas (lobbyist), co-owner of the lobbying firm LLM Communications
 Ben Lucas (wheelchair racer) (born 1965), New Zealand sports administrator and retired wheelchair racer 
 Ben Lucas (American football) (born 1996), high school football player